Unirea National College may refer to one of three educational institutions in Romania:

Unirea National College (Braşov)
Unirea National College (Focşani)
Unirea National College (Târgu Mureş)